Events in 1992 in Japanese television.

Debuts

Ongoing shows
Music Fair, music (1964–present)
Mito Kōmon, jidaigeki (1969-2011)
Sazae-san, anime (1969–present)
Ōoka Echizen, jidaigeki (1970-1999)
FNS Music Festival, music (1974-present)
Panel Quiz Attack 25, game show (1975–present)
Doraemon, anime (1979-2005)
Kiteretsu Daihyakka, anime (1988-1996)
Soreike! Anpanman, anime (1988-present)
Dragon Ball Z, anime (1989–1996)
Downtown no Gaki no Tsukai ya Arahende!!, game show (1989–present)

Endings

See also
1992 in anime
List of Japanese television dramas
1992 in Japan
List of Japanese films of 1992

References